USS Deft (AM-216) was an  built for the United States Navy during World War II. She was built to clear minefields in offshore waters, and served the Navy in the Pacific Ocean.

She was launched 28 March 1943 by Tampa Shipbuilding Co., Inc., Tampa, Florida; sponsored by Mrs. E. H. Jacobs; and commissioned 16 April 1945.

World War II Pacific Ocean operations 

Deft sailed from Norfolk, Virginia, 22 June 1945 and called at San Diego, California, Pearl Harbor, Saipan, and Okinawa before arriving at Sasebo, Japan, 21 September. She swept mines off the coast of Honshū, and served in various occupation duties until 15 December when she got underway for the West Coast.

Deft arrived at San Pedro, California, 4 April 1946 and remained there for local operations until 13 August when she sailed for the Philippines.

Post-War decommissioning  

She reached Subic Bay 24 October, was decommissioned 9 November 1946 and transferred to the Republic of China 27 August 1948. She was scrapped by the Chinese Navy 16 January 1959.

Awards 

Deft received one battle star for World War II service.

References

External links 

 

Admirable-class minesweepers
World War II mine warfare vessels of the United States
Ships built in Tampa, Florida
1943 ships